In political geography, an enclave is a piece of land entirely surrounded by the territory of another equivalent-level entity (and only that entity).  An exclave is a piece of land that is politically connected to a larger piece but not physically conterminous with it because the territory of other equivalent-level entity or entities entirely surround it.  Many entities are both enclaves and exclaves.

In Pennsylvania, every county in the state, other than the counties of Fulton, Philadelphia, Pike and Union, contains at least one municipality surrounded completely by another municipality.  While Pennsylvania's urban counties contain few enclaves due to municipal fragmentation, rural areas feature numerous enclaved municipalities.  Many resulted from small town centers separating from their rural surrounding areas.

There are at least 338 enclaves (that are not exclaves) in Pennsylvania comprising incorporated places and census-designated places (CDP) within other county subdivisions. Of these, 260 are boroughs (out of 957 in the state), 75 are CDPs (out of 749), two are townships (out of 1547) and one is a city (out of 57).  Although each CDP is technically a part of the township(s) in which it is located, these two types of subdivision are considered to be distinct entities.

Usually, the enclave (that is not an exclave) takes the form of a borough that is surrounded by the township of which it was originally a part, but other scenarios are possible, e.g.,
the borough of Mount Oliver is an enclave of the city of Pittsburgh;
Pitcairn borough, of the municipality of Monroeville;
Dale borough, of the city of Johnstown;
Export borough, of the borough of Murrysville;
both New Galilee and Homewood boroughs, of the borough of Big Beaver;
the Lackawanna County township of Elmhurst, of Roaring Brook Township;
the Tioga County township of Putnam, of Covington Township.

Pennsylvania enclaves that are not exclaves

Adams County
Aspers, CDP
Bendersville, borough
Biglerville, borough
Bonneauville, borough
Fairfield,  borough
Hampton,  CDP
New Oxford,  borough
Allegheny County
Curtisville,  CDP
Mount Oliver, borough
Pennsbury Village, borough
Pitcairn,  borough
West View,  borough
Armstrong County
Dayton, borough
Elderton,  borough
Rural Valley, borough
Worthington, borough
Beaver County
Darlington, borough
Homewood,  borough
Hookstown,  borough
New Galilee, borough
Bedford County
Bedford, borough
Coaldale, borough
Everett,  borough
Hyndman,  borough
New Paris,  borough
Pleasantville, borough
Rainsburg,  borough
Saxton,  borough
Schellsburg, borough
St. Clairsville, borough
Woodbury,  borough
Berks County
Amity Gardens, CDP
Bally,  borough
Centerport,  borough
Flying Hills, CDP
Kutztown,  borough
Laureldale,  borough
Lenhartsville, borough
Mohnton,  borough
Strausstown, former borough
Blair County
Bellwood, borough
Martinsburg, borough
Roaring Spring, borough
Tipton,  CDP
Tyrone,  borough
Bradford County
Canton, borough
Le Raysville, borough
Monroe,  borough
Rome, borough
Sylvania,  borough
Troy, borough
Bucks County
Newtown, borough
Richlandtown, borough
Silverdale,  borough
Trumbauersville, borough
Woodside,  CDP
Butler County
Bruin, borough
East Butler, borough
Fairview,  borough
Fox Run,  CDP
Harrisville, borough
Karns City,  borough
Mars, borough
Nixon,  CDP
West Sunbury, borough
Cambria County
Dale, borough
Ebensburg,  borough
Lilly,  borough
Loretto,  borough
University of Pittsburgh Johnstown, CDP
Wilmore,  borough
Cameron County
Driftwood, borough
Emporium,  borough
Carbon County
Beaver Meadows,  borough
Centre County
Bellefonte, borough
Centre Hall, borough
Coburn,  CDP
Howard,  borough
Julian,  CDP
Madisonburg, CDP
Milesburg,  borough
Pine Glen,  CDP
Port Matilda, borough
Rebersburg, CDP
Sandy Ridge, CDP
Spring Mills, CDP
Stormstown, CDP
Unionville, borough
Woodward,  CDP
Chester County
Chesterbrook, CDP
Honey Brook, borough
Kennett Square, borough
Toughkenamon, CDP
West Grove,  borough
Clarion County
Callensburg, borough
Knox, borough
Shippenville, borough
St. Petersburg, borough
Strattanville, borough
Clearfield County
Coalport,  borough
Curwensville, borough
Grampian,  borough
Hyde, CDP
Irvona,  borough
Mahaffey,  borough
Troutville,  borough
Clinton County
Avis, borough
Loganton,  borough
Columbia County
Benton, borough
Buckhorn,  CDP
Centralia, borough
Jamison City, CDP
Jerseytown, CDP
Jonestown, CDP
Mainville,  CDP
Mifflinville, CDP
Orangeville, borough
Slabtown,  CDP
Stillwater,  borough
Crawford County
Adamsville, CDP
Atlantic,  CDP
Cambridge Springs, borough
Canadohta Lake, CDP
Geneva,  CDP
Guys Mills, CDP
Harmonsburg, CDP
Hydetown,  borough
Lincolnville, CDP
Linesville,  borough
Spartansburg, borough
Springboro,  borough
Townville,  borough
Cumberland County
Mount Holly Springs, borough
New Kingstown, CDP
Newburg, borough
Plainfield, CDP
Dauphin County
Berrysburg, borough
Dauphin,  borough
Elizabethville, borough
Gratz,  borough
Halifax,  borough
Millersburg, borough
Skyline View, CDP
Williamstown, borough
Delaware County
East Lansdowne, borough
Lima, CDP
Elk County
Johnsonburg,  borough
Ridgway,  borough
Erie County
Albion, borough
Edinboro,  borough
McKean,  borough
Mill Village, borough
North East,  borough
Union City,  borough
Waterford,  borough
Fayette County
Dunbar, borough
Fairchance,  borough
Markleysburg, borough
Ohiopyle,  borough
Perryopolis, borough
Smithfield,  borough
Vanderbilt,  borough
Forest County
Tionesta, borough
Franklin County
Greencastle, borough
Mont Alto,  borough
Orrstown,  borough
Greene County
Jefferson, borough
Huntingdon County
Alexandria,  borough
Cassville,  borough
Coalmont,  borough
Dudley,  borough
Orbisonia,  borough
Rockhill Furnace, borough
Saltillo,  borough
Shade Gap,  borough
Shirleysburg, borough
Three Springs, borough
Indiana County
Armagh, borough
Clymer,  borough
Commodore,  CDP
Creekside,  borough
Ernest,  borough
Marion Center, borough
Plumville,  borough
Shelocta,  borough
Smicksburg,  borough
Jefferson County
Brockway,  borough
Reynoldsville, borough
Summerville, borough
Juniata County
McAlisterville, CDP
Mexico, CDP
Mifflin,  borough
Mifflintown, borough
Thompsontown, borough
Lackawanna County
Elmhurst Township, township
Lancaster County
Lititz, borough
Maytown,  CDP
New Holland, borough
Strasburg,  borough
Terre Hill,  borough
Lawrence County
Bessemer, borough
S.N.P.J. (Slovenska Narodna Podporna Jednota (Slovene National Benefit Society)), borough
Lebanon County
Myerstown, borough
Schaefferstown, CDP
Lehigh County
Alburtis, borough
Ancient Oaks, CDP
Luzerne County
Ashley, borough
Bear Creek Village, borough
Conyngham,  borough
Freeland,  borough
Lycoming County
Hughesville, borough
Muncy,  borough
Salladasburg, borough
McKean County
Eldred, borough
Kane, borough
Mount Jewett, borough
Port Allegany, borough
Smethport,  borough
Mercer County
Jackson Center, borough
Sandy Lake,  borough
Sheakleyville, borough
West Middlesex, borough
Mifflin County
Belleville, CDP
Juniata Terrace, borough
Milroy,  CDP
Newton Hamilton, borough
Monroe County
Brodheadsville, CDP
Mountainhome, CDP
Montgomery County
Hatfield,  borough
Narberth,  borough
North Wales, borough
Montour County
Washingtonville, borough
Northampton County
Chapman,  borough
Pen Argyl,  borough
Northumberland County
McEwensville, borough
Mount Carmel, borough
Sunbury,  city
Turbotville, borough
Perry County
Blain, borough
Bloomfield,  borough
Landisburg,  borough
Potter County
Coudersport, borough
Schuylkill County
Beurys Lake,  CDP
Deer Lake,  borough
Delano,  CDP
Friedensburg, CDP
Girardville, borough
Gordon,  borough
Heckscherville, CDP
Hometown,  CDP
Lavelle,  CDP
Mahanoy City, borough
McKeansburg, CDP
Middleport,  borough
New Philadelphia, borough
New Ringgold, borough
Oneida,  CDP
Renningers, CDP
Ringtown,  borough
Sheppton,  CDP
Snyder County
Beavertown, borough
Freeburg,  borough
Middleburg,  borough
Paxtonville, CDP
Troxelville, CDP
Somerset County
Addison, borough
Berlin,  borough
Boswell,  borough
Cairnbrook, CDP
Central City, borough
Davidsville, CDP
Edie, CDP
Friedens,  CDP
Indian Lake, borough
Jennerstown, borough
Meyersdale,  borough
New Centerville, borough
Salisbury,  borough
Shanksville, borough
Somerset,  borough
Stoystown,  borough
Ursina, borough
Sullivan County
Dushore, borough
Eagles Mere, borough
Laporte,  borough
Susquehanna County
Great Bend,  borough
Hallstead,  borough
Montrose,  borough
New Milford, borough
Thompson,  borough
Tioga County
Knoxville, borough
Liberty, borough
Mansfield,  borough
Putnam Township, township
Roseville,  borough
Tioga,  borough
Westfield,  borough
Venango County
Clintonville, borough
Cooperstown, borough
Seneca,  CDP
Warren County
Clarendon, borough
Sheffield,  CDP
Sugar Grove, borough
Youngsville, borough
Washington County
Burgettstown, borough
Claysville,  borough
West Middletown, borough
Wolfdale,  CDP
Wayne County
Bethany, borough
Westmoreland County
Adamsburg,  borough
Arona,  borough
Derry,  borough
Donegal,  borough
Export,  borough
Fellsburg,  CDP
Harrison City, CDP
Herminie,  CDP
Hostetter,  CDP
Laurel Mountain, borough
Ligonier,  borough
Millwood,  CDP
Seward, borough
Youngstown,  borough
Wyoming County
Nicholson, borough
York County
Dillsburg, borough
East Prospect, borough
Emigsville, CDP
Franklintown, borough
Glen Rock,  borough
Hallam,  borough
Jacobus,  borough
Loganville,  borough
New Salem,  borough
Stewartstown, borough
Valley View, CDP
Wellsville,  borough
Windsor,  borough
Winterstown, borough
Yorkana,  borough

Pennsylvania exclaves that are not enclaves

To be a true exclave, all potential paths of travel from the exclave to the main region must cross over the territory of a different region or regions having the equivalent governmental administrative level.
Two municipalities of Berks County have exclaves.
Lower Alsace Township has a southern portion that is disconnected from the main portion of the township by Reading and Mount Penn.
Cumru Township has two exclaves, one that is an enclave of Reading and one that is surrounded by Reading and West Reading.
Birmingham Township and Chester County have an exclave along a bend in the Brandywine Creek that borders the state of Delaware to the south and is surrounded by Chadds Ford Township and Delaware County on three sides. 
 Three municipalities in Delaware County have exclaves. 
Springfield Township has an exclave separated from the main body of the township by the village of Swarthmore.
Darby Township consists of two non-contiguous areas.
Part of Upper Darby is separated from the main body of the township by Aldan and Lansdowne.
 Three municipalities in Lehigh County have exclaves. 
 Salisbury Township has a smaller western portion that is separated from the larger eastern portion by Allentown and Emmaus.
 Upper Milford Township has a small exclave that is separated from the rest of the township by Emmaus.
 Upper Saucon Township has a small exclave that is surrounded by Coopersburg and Springfield Township, Bucks County.
 In Allegheny County, O'Hara Township consists of five non-contiguous areas, with Sharpsburg, Aspinwall and Fox Chapel separating them.
 In Lackawanna County, South Abington Township has an isolated section along Glenburn Road surrounded by Clarks Summit borough, Clarks Green borough, and Waverly Township. The township also has several virtual exclaves as it is oddly shaped and surrounds Clarks Summit, Clarks Green, and Waverly Township collectively on three sides.
In Somerset County, Middlecreek Township has an exclave surrounded by Seven Springs and Jefferson Township.

Pennsylvania pene-enclaves/exclaves
Like enclaves and exclaves, pene-enclaves and pene-exclaves are regions that are not contiguous with the main land region and have land access only through another region or regions having the equivalent governmental administrative level.  Unlike enclaves and exclaves, they are not entirely surrounded by outside territory.  Hence, they are enclaves or exclaves for practical purposes, without meeting the strict definition.

 In Lehigh County, the westernmost section of the city of Allentown is a pene-en(ex)clave connected at a quadripoint with South Whitehall Township, which surrounds it.
In Cambria County, Portage consists of two sections that are connected at a single point (a quadripoint).

See also
 Enclaves and exclaves
 List of enclaves and exclaves
 List of places in Pennsylvania
 List of cities in Pennsylvania
 List of towns and boroughs in Pennsylvania
 List of census-designated places in Pennsylvania
 List of townships in Pennsylvania
 List of counties in Pennsylvania

References

Geography of Pennsylvania